One Night Stand is a 2011 documentary film that documents the 24 Hour Musicals event that featured the creation of four musicals in a 24-hour period. The film had its World Premiere at the July 2011 NewFest, New York's LGBT Film Festival and features Cheyenne Jackson, Mandy Gonzalez, Roger Bart.

References 

2011 documentary films
2011 films
Films about musical theatre
American documentary films
2010s American films